The New Zealand Union of Students' Associations (NZUSA) is a representative body that advocates for the interests of tertiary students in New Zealand. Between 1935 and 2006, it was known as the New Zealand University Students' Association, until it merged with the national polytechnic students' association.

History
The organisation was founded in 1929 as the New Zealand National Union of Students, and initially focussed its activities on sporting and social concerns. It changed its name to the New Zealand University Students' Association in 1935, and over time gave greater focus to issues concerning student welfare, such as student access to healthcare. It developed a strong involvement in social issues during the 1960s and 1970s, opposing the Vietnam War, apartheid, and racial immigration policies, as well as supporting homosexual law reform.

The association has a long history of advocating for its members by opposing NZ Government policies it viewed as not in the interests of students. During the 1990s and 2000s the New Zealand government and New Zealand universities made large increases in fees for students, and limited access to allowances for study. These changes attracted much criticism from the NZUSA. In the 2005 New Zealand general election the organisation strongly advocated in favour of policies it long held. These include reduction of student debt, and universal access to student allowances for full-time students. Such policy was supported by many minor parties, including the Greens, New Zealand First and United Future. The Fifth Labour Government introduced 0% interest on student loans policy, but the organisation continues to campaign against decreasing access to student allowances and systemic fee increases.

NZUSA campaigned against the introduction of voluntary student membership (VSM), arguing that students did support compulsory membership of students' associations. NZUSA proposed a policy compromise, suggesting a "KiwiSaver style" opt-out arrangement where students would be members unless they explicitly said they did not want to be. Although NZUSA had campaigned against VSM for fifteen years, in 2012 all students' associations were required to be voluntary.

Historical achievements

NZUSA Lobby Gains
 1988 allowances were themselves the result of 1985-1988 lobbying with officials
 In 1992 alone NZUSA achieved $10 million in benefits for students by getting Community Service Cards for all students in face of Ministerial opposition
 Prevented student loan repayments being applied to all jobs attracting secondary tax
 2000: Freeze on fees
 2010: Restrictions on increases in CSSFs
 2012: Collaborative partnership for utilizing the Student Voice
 
Gains though engagement
 2000: Review of loan scheme massively improves student experience and efficiency of delivery 
 1929 - 2013: Constant involvement with government over regulations and procedures 
 1996-2000: Students added to CUAP (committee of university academic programmes), AAU (academic audit unit), TEC Board and Learners' Advisory Committee 
 Expansion of the categories covered by the Ministerial Direction in 2011 and defending that in December 2012 
 2012: enthusiastic support for learner panels and best practice Student Voice principles project

Gains though elections
 1999: Education number two issue; change of government
 2005: Interest-free loans policy assists re-election of Labour Government
 2008: Interest-free loans adopted as National Party policy
 2011: Labour Party commits to universal allowance policy (joining Greens)

Held VSM off for 15 years
Activists from other associations assisted in all of these campaigns.
 1996: Michael Laws VSM Bill is defeated in the Select Committee process
 1998: VSM Bill converted from imposing individual membership to requiring referendums
 2000: WSU returns to universal membership through a student vote
 2001: AuSM, WITSA and SAWIT return to universal membership
 2006: USU returns to universal membership

Wins for the tertiary sector
 1989: prevented a privatised loan-scheme by scaring off the banks
 1994: Todd Taskforce plan for increasing fees from $1500 to $7000 per year defeated
 1999: White Paper proposing privatization dropped by National Government after massive student protests
 2003: Introduction of fee maxima
 2009: National Party also adopts fee maxima policy
 2011: 120 of 121 MPs from parties supporting interest-free student loan policy

NZUSA after Voluntary Student Membership

Since the introduction of voluntary student membership (VSM) in 2012, NZUSA has faced significant challenges. VSM led to the organisation no longer being guaranteed a revenue stream from member associations, and by 2012 its funding had decreased by a third as members cut their contributions due to financial hardship.

Withdrawal of association memberships
In August 2013, Waikato Students' Union announced that it would "temporarily withdraw" from NZUSA. In response, Auckland University Students' Association (AUSA), Victoria University of Wellington Students' Association (VUWSA) Otago University Students' Association (OUSA) put out a press release calling for significant reforms of NZUSA.

Subsequently referendums were held at OUSA and VUWSA as to whether they should stay members of the national union. The membership of both unions voted to stay part of the organisation, but the presidents at the respective organisations have promised substantial reforms.

In September 2014, VUWSA President Sonya Clark announced that after a unanimous vote by the executive, VUWSA would be withdrawing from the organisation (and had given its obligatory one-year notice of withdrawal). President Clark said:

In response, NZUSA President Daniel Haines said he was

In November 2014, OUSA announced that it would also be withdrawing from NZUSA. Postgraduate Officer Kurt Purdon said NZUSA missed the opportunity to prove themselves in 2014, but instead of proving themselves, OUSA President Ruby Sycamore-Smith had single handedly done more for Otago students than NZUSA. He further said: "We lose credibility by being a part of them. Even if membership were free, I’d have serious questions about being a member."

NZUSA President Daniel Haines criticised OUSA for a lack of communication over their concerns, and responded to the withdrawal by saying:

In January 2015, former-VUWSA President Rory McCourt was elected President of NZUSA. He planned to focus on original research and "one central campaign" in his term.

In June 2015, after refusing for a number of months to pay its NZUSA membership fees, VUWSA agreed to pay its outstanding fees. (NZUSA argued that membership fees were still payable because VUWSA was in the 12-months-long withdrawal period.) The reversal came after NZUSA President Rory McCourt had waged a public campaign to get VUWSA to both reconsider its withdrawal from NZUSA and also to pay the fees outstanding.

Victoria University students voted in late 2015 in a referendum to have VUWSA rejoin the national union.

Members

 ASA - Albany Students' Association
 AUSA - Auckland University Students' Association 
 SAWIT - Students' Association of Waikato Institute of Technology
 Younited - Eastern Institute of Technology Students' Association
 VUWSA - Victoria University of Wellington Students' Association
 MUSA - Massey University Students' Association
 USC - Unitec Student Council
 SAU - Students’ Association of UCOL
 Weltec & Whitireia Student Council
 MAWSA - Massey Wellington Students' Association
 LUSA - Lincoln University Students' Association
 OUSA - Otago University Students' Association
 M@D - Massey at Distance

Structure

List of Association Presidents, Co-Presidents, and Vice-Presidents

Tertiary Women New Zealand

Tertiary Women New Zealand (TWNZ) is a sub-group of NZUSA, dedicated to advocacy on behalf of women in tertiary education across the country. It comes from a position that acknowledges the systematic oppression of women and also considers how this intersects with class, race, ethnicity, sexuality, and ability. TWNZ is composed of women's associations at tertiary institutions across the country  and the current sitting NWRO is Izzy O'Neill.

See also
List of New Zealand tertiary students' associations
Tertiary education in New Zealand
Students' union
Student voice
Student activism

References

External links

students.org.nz – NZUSA official website

Students' associations in New Zealand